Peng Jianbing (born April 1953) is a Chinese geologist currently serving as doctoral supervisor and dean of the School of Geology Engineering and Geomatics, Chang'an University.

Education
Peng was born in Macheng, Hubei in April 1953. In 1978 he graduated from China University of Geosciences (Wuhan). He earned his  Ph.D. degree in engineering from Xi'an Institute of Engineering (now Chang'an University) in June 1999.

Career
From 1978 to 1997 he assumed various posts in Xi'an Institute of Geology. He taught at Xi'an Institute of Engineering between 1997 and 2000. He was dean of the College of Geological Engineering and Geomatics, Chang’an University in 2000, and held that office until 2011. He has been dean of the School of Geology Engineering and Geomatics, Chang'an University since 2011.

Honours and awards
 2015 14th Li Siguang Geological Science Award
 November 22, 2019 Member of the Chinese Academy of Sciences (CAS)

References

1953 births
Living people
People from Macheng
Scientists from Hubei
Chinese geologists
China University of Geosciences alumni
Chang'an University alumni
Academic staff of Chang'an University
Members of the Chinese Academy of Sciences